Psychological drama or psychodrama is a sub-genre of drama that places emphasis on psychological elements. It often overlaps with other genres such as crime, fantasy, black comedy, and science fiction, and it is closely related with the psychological horror and psychological thriller genres. Psychological dramas use these genres' tropes to focus on the human condition and psychological effects, usually in a mature and serious tone. 

Psychological dramas explore thematic elements such as abandonment, coming-of-age problems, denialism, disability, distorted sequences, dysfunctional relationships, human sexuality, mental disorders, mood swings, odd behaviors, post-traumatic stress disorder, psychological abuse, psychedelic art, social issues, and other serious discussions that highlight both issues of the characters' lives and reality.

Known filmmakers 
Paul Thomas Anderson - An American filmmaker known for his depictions of flawed characters and exploration of subjects and themes such as dysfunctional families, alienation, loneliness and redemption. Known psychological dramas of his include Magnolia (1999), There Will Be Blood (2007), and The Master (2012).
Hideaki Anno - A Japanese filmmaker whose best known work, Neon Genesis Evangelion, delves into heavy psychological themes in its latter half.
Darren Aronofsky - An American filmmaker, well known for directing some of the most notoriously visceral psychological dramas in the 21st century, such as the cult classic film, Requiem for a Dream (2000), and others that subjects of actor's career resurgence and deal with melodramatic themes and surrealism in films such as The Wrestler (2008), Black Swan (2010), Mother! (2017), and The Whale (2022).
Ingmar Bergman - A Swedish filmmaker, regarded by many as one of the greatest directors in European cinema, who applied his creative and avant-garde vision to psychological drama films such as Persona (1966).
Bernardo Bertolucci - An Italian filmmaker, who is known for exploring "sexual relations among characters stuck in a psychological crisis" such as in his erotic film Last Tango in Paris (1972).
Sofia Coppola - An American filmmaker, daughter of Francis Ford Coppola, known for psychological drama films such as The Virgin Suicides (1999) and Lost in Translation (2003).
Alejandro González Iñárritu - A Mexican filmmaker who has directed numerous films that focus on aspects of the human condition, notably The Death trilogy; Amores perros (2000), 21 Grams (2003) and Babel (2006) as well as his fourth feature, Biutiful (2010).
Charlie Kaufman - An American director and screenwriter, who explored universal themes like identity crisis, mortality, and the meaning of life through a metaphysical or parapsychological framework, as shown in films like his directorial works, Synecdoche, New York (2008) and Anomalisa (2015).
Krzysztof Kieślowski - A Polish filmmaker, known for his psychological drama films such as the Three Colours trilogy.
Akira Kurosawa - A Japanese filmmaker, considered among the greatest directors of all time, who directed psychological dramas such as Drunken Angel (1948) and Ikiru (1952).
Yorgos Lanthimos - A Greek filmmaker known for his themes about absurdity, animal cruelty, odd behaviors, dark humors, and unrequited relationships.
Tom McCarthy - An American filmmaker and actor, well known for his critically acclaimed independent films The Station Agent (2003) and The Visitor (2007).
Brillante Mendoza - A Filipino filmmaker, known for his independent psychological drama films like The Masseur (2005) and Captive (2012).
Gaspar Noé - An Argentine avant-garde filmmaker shares an attenuated use of narrative, generally assaulting and often illegible cinematography, confrontational subject material, a treatment of sexual behavior as violent rather than mutually intimate, and a pervasive sense of social nihilism or despair, with such his polarizing feature films as I Stand Alone (1998), Irréversible (2002), 8 (2008), Enter the Void (2009), and Vortex (2021).
Steven Soderbergh - An American filmmaker, well known for his independent films featuring explorations of the human condition, such as in his critically acclaimed debut Sex, Lies, and Videotape (1989).
Andrei Tarkovsky - A Russian filmmaker, known for his philosophical and psychological movies dealing with existence, faith and dreamlike memories, such as Solaris (1972), Mirror (1975) and Stalker (1979).
Denis Villeneuve - A French Canadian filmmaker, primarily known for directing drama and science fiction films featuring psychological elements such as Maelstrom (2000), Enemy (2013), and Arrival (2016).
Lars von Trier - A Danish artistic filmmaker with a confrontational examination of issues and controversial subject matters such as Europa (1991), Riget (1994-2022), Breaking the Waves (1996), Antichrist (2009), and Melancholia (2011).

Notable examples

Films

Early examples 
Psychological drama is possibly known one of the fewest and oldest of film subgenres in the early-20th century, with the earliest examples are The Whispering Chorus (1918) and Greed (1924). Other early examples of popular psychological drama films in the early-to-mid 20th century include:
 La vuelta al nido (1938)
 The Best Years of Our Lives (1946)
 Death of a Salesman (1951)
 Johnny Belinda (1948)
 A Place in the Sun (1951)
 The Snake Pit (1948)
 A Streetcar Named Desire (1951)

Modern examples 
1960s - Lolita (1962)
1970s - One Flew Over the Cuckoo's Nest (1975), Taxi Driver (1976), Equus (1977)
1980s - Ordinary People, The Ninth Configuration (both 1980), Pink Floyd - The Wall, Sophie's Choice (both 1982)
1990s - Heavenly Creatures (1994), Shine (1996), Good Will Hunting (1997), The Truman Show (1998), Eyes Wide Shut, Fight Club (both 1999)
2000s - Requiem for a Dream (2000), The Hours (2002), Elephant, Harvie Krumpet (both 2003), Little Children (2006), Funny People, Mary and Max (both 2009)
2010s - Shame, Sucker Punch (both 2011), It's Such a Beautiful Day, Aparisyon, Jagten (all three in 2012), When Marnie Was There, Whiplash (both 2014), All I See Is You (2016)
2020s - The Father (2020), The Power of the Dog (2021)

Television 

The Affair
Bates Motel
Criminal
Bojack Horseman - an adult animated tragicomedy series depicts darker psychological themes for its realistic take on depression, trauma, addiction, self-destructive behavior, racism, sexism, sexuality, and the human condition.
The Cry
 A Death in California
 The Handmaid's Tale
Maniac
Ray Donovan
 This Is Us
 Yellowjackets

Video games 

 To the Moon (2011) - an independent video game that is considered to be a psychological drama. It was inspired by Kan Gao's grandfather's condition and the 2004 film Eternal Sunshine of the Spotless Mind.
Irrational (2019) - a psychological drama story-driven game made in RPG Maker MV. The story focuses on Lucy, a young woman struggles of living with generalized anxiety.
Rainswept (2019) - an adventure and murder mystery game about an emotional story set in an immersive and atmospheric game world dealing with themes of love, relationships and unresolved trauma.
Memories Of East Coast (2021) - A debut game of an immersive visual novel experience that brings you on a journey through memory, nostalgia and guilt.

Anime and manga 

 A Silent Voice
Akagi
Chicago
 The Flowers of Evil
 The Fruit of Grisaia
Himizu
Neon Genesis Evangelion
Rascal Does Not Dream of Bunny Girl Senpai
Scum's Wish
The Tatami Galaxy
Welcome to the N.H.K.
Wonder Egg Priority

Others 
 Literature - The Winter Wives (2021)
 Novel - Saint X
Theater play - The Chinese Lady
Novel - Trish

See also 

 Social thriller
 Melodrama
 Tragedy
 Courtroom drama
 Postmodernist film
 Social issues

References 

Psychological drama films
Psychological drama television and other works
Psychological fiction
Drama films
Drama television series
Drama genres
Drama
Film genres
Television genres
Video game genres